FIBA Asia Under-20 Championship for Women 2006 is FIBA Asia's basketball championship for females under 20 years old. The games were held at Singapore.

The championship is divided into two levels: Level I and Level II. The two lowest finishers of Level I meets the top two finishers to determine which teams qualify for Level for next championship. The losers are relegated to Level II.

Participating teams

Preliminary round

Level I

Level II

Qualifying round
Winners are promoted to Level I.

Final round

Semifinals

3rd place

Final

Final standing

Awards

External links
FIBA Asia
JABBA

2006
2006 in women's basketball
2006–07 in Asian basketball
International women's basketball competitions hosted by Singapore
Bask
2006 in youth sport